Ben Webster (1909–1973) was an American jazz tenor saxophonist.

Ben Webster may also refer to:
 Benjamin Nottingham Webster (1797–1882), English actor
 Ben Webster (actor) (1864–1947), English actor
 Ben Webster (businessman) (1930–1997), Canadian businessman